The IFFI Indian Film Personality of the Year is a National honor instituted by the International Film Festival of India. The recipient is honored for their "outstanding contribution to the growth and development of Cinema of India. The award was first instituted in the year 2013 from the 44th IFFI.

Indian Film Personality of the Year (2013–Present)
Since 2013, on the occasion of 100 years of Cinema of India, the Award for the "Indian Film Personality of the Year" was instituted. The annual award is presented to an Indian film personality for their outstanding contribution to the Indian Film Industry through their craft. This Award consists of a Silver Peacock Medal, a certificate and a cash prize of ₹ 10,00,000.

IFFI Golden Jubilee ICON Award
On the occasion of Golden Jubilee year of IFFI, veteran actor Rajinikanth was conferred with the Golden Jubilee ICON Award in the year 2019.

References

External links
Official Page for Directorate of Film Festivals, India

Lists of Indian award winners
International Film Festival of India
Indian film festivals
Festivals in Goa